Udayagiri is a  village in Taliparamba taluk of Kannur District in Kerala, India. It is about 55 km from Kannur city.

Economy
The people of this village mainly depend on agriculture for their income.  The villagers of this hamlet migrated from the southern parts of Kerala in the early 1940s, most of them from Kottayam and Ernakulam district.  These days the economy is driven by remittances from people employed elsewhere.

History
An aboriginal population of hunter-gatherers, known locally as "Maayilyans" lived here for generations before the so-called settlers from the southern part of Kerala arrived. They survived on hunting and gathering honey in the vast forests. The Maayilyan community was pushed out of the forests, their way of life, and displaced by the migrants. The "Maayilyans" became either daily wage workers in the area or survived on making and selling artifacts out of bamboo.

During the early days (1950s), the settlers lived in tree houses to escape from the large number of elephants present in the area. The needs of the population were very basic. They cleared forests and planted rice, yucca and bananas. The essential services like local hospitals or schools did not exist. Transportation was very limited. Educational institutions were tens of miles away. The daily staples beyond what they produced, had to come from Thaliparamba, which was about 35 km away by foot. Many early families in the area had to fight years-long, painful legal battles to get their land rights.

Geography
Udayagiri is a hilly village on the eastern side of Kannur district.  The terrain is undulating in nature and the extreme eastern side has forests bordering Karnataka state.

Major agricultural crops grown are 

 Rubber Tree
 Coconut Palm
 Arecanut Palm
 Black pepper
 Vanilla
 Cashewnut
 Cocoa

Chathamangalam Hill Station 
Chathamangalam (Kannur) is a beautiful hill station in Udayagiri panchayath. Starting in Udayagiri panchayath Chathamangalam hill station extends to neighbouring Cherupuzha and Alakode panchayaths.

Pythalmala

Pythalmala is a hill station, situated 4,500 ft. above sea level near the Kerala-Karnataka border, and is rich in flora and fauna.  It is a 6 km trek to the top of the hills.

Transportation
The National Highway 66 passes through Taliparamba town. Goa and Mumbai can be accessed on the northern side and Cochin and Thiruvananthapuram can be accessed on the southern side.  Taliparamba has a good bus station and buses are easily available to all parts of Kannur district.  The road to the east of Iritty connects to Mysore and Bangalore. The nearest railway stations are Kannapuram  and Kannur on the Mangalore-Palakkad line. 
Trains are available to almost all parts of India subject to advance booking over the internet. The nearest airport is Kannur International Airport which is about 60 kilometres from Udayagiri.

References

Villages near Taliparamba